Undervirilization is a medical term describing the state of a male whose body, especially the genitalia, shows evidence of below-normal prenatal (less commonly pubertal) androgen effects. 

See virilization for a more detailed description of the normal process and newborn status.

See also
 Sexual differentiation
 Defeminization and masculinization
 Defeminization
 Feminization

References

Medical terminology